Paolo Maria Bonomino (1703 – post 1779) was an Italian painter, mainly active in Bergamo as a portraitist during the Rococo or late-Baroque period.

Biography
He was born in Bergamo, and trained under Fra Galgario. His paintings were afterwards often confused with those of his master.

References

1703 births
1780 deaths
Italian portrait painters
18th-century Italian painters
Italian male painters
Painters from Bergamo
Italian Baroque painters
18th-century Italian male artists